Rakolta is a surname. Notable people with the surname include:

John Rakolta (born 1947), American businessman
Terry Rakolta (born 1944), American activist